"Roll into One" is a song by New Zealand recording artist, Bic Runga. The song was released in December 1997 as the fourth single from her debut studio album, Drive (1997)

Track listing
"Roll into One" - 3:20
"Drive" (Doordarshan mix) - 6:25
"Drive" (Interstellar over Drive mix) - 7:16

Chart positions

References

External links
Bic's official website

1997 singles
Bic Runga songs
1997 songs
Columbia Records singles
Songs written by Bic Runga